Jimmy Quinlan (born December 2, 1981 in Edmonton, Alberta) is a retired lacrosse player and current assistant coach for the Saskatchewan Rush in the National Lacrosse League and 3 time NLL champion.

Professional career
Quinlan was acquired by the Edmonton Rush after playing his rookie season with the 2005 Champion's Cup Toronto Rock.  Quinlan was named Transition Player of the Week for his 5-point effort in week 6 of the 2008 NLL season.

Quinlan played with the Coquitlam Adanacs from 2003 to 2006, prior to joining the Sherwood Park Outlaws of the Rocky Mountain Lacrosse League to capture the Presidents Cup in 2007.

Quinlan retired as a player after the 2013 season as the last original player from season 1 of the Edmonton Rush and became the defensive coach for the Edmonton Rush.

On January 17, 2013, the Edmonton Rush Honored Jimmy by retiring his number 81 to the rafters of Rexall Place, joining the ranks of NHL Mark Messier, Wayne Gretzky, Paul Coffey, Jari Kurri, Al Hamilton, Grant Fuhr, Glenn Anderson and Edmonton Oilers Play By Play Announcer Rod Philips. Demotix.com

He has the only Edmonton Rush number retired.

His career spanned 9 seasons (Toronto Rock and Edmonton Rush), 108 games and only missing 1 game in that time.

Career stats 
Games Played 
Regular Season  135
Playoff 7
All Star 2

Points 234 Career
Goals 108
Assists 126

PIMs 237

Other than playing in the NLL, Quinlan is a grade 7 and 9 mathematics teacher at Vimy Ridge Academy in Edmonton, Alberta.

Quinlan is now a Defensive Coach with the 2014 Edmonton Rush

He had his jersey number 81 retired by the Edmonton Rush during the 2014 season.

Statistics

NLL

References

1981 births
Canadian lacrosse players
Edmonton Rush players
Living people
Sportspeople from Edmonton
Toronto Rock players